11 o'clock number is a theatre term for a big, show-stopping song that occurs late in the second act of a two-act musical, in which a major character, often the protagonist, comes to an important realization. Examples include "So Long Dearie" from Hello, Dolly!, "If He Walked Into My Life" from Mame, "Rose's Turn" from Gypsy, "Work the Wound" from Passing Strange, and "Cabaret" from Cabaret. It was so named because in the days when musical performances would start at 8:30 p.m., this song would occur around 11:00 p.m.

Among the theatre community, there is some debate as to the characteristics of an 11 o'clock number. It often signifies a moment of revelation or change in heart of a lead character, although there are exceptions to this. The 11 o'clock number is also differentiated from the finale in that it is not the final number in the show, but even this is not considered a requirement by some commenters. Broadway producer Jack Viertel defines an 11 o'clock number as "a final star turn".

Other notable 11 o'clock numbers include "Sit Down, You're Rockin' the Boat" from Guys and Dolls, "Memory" from Cats, "Brotherhood of Man" from How to Succeed in Business Without Really Trying, “No Good Deed” from Wicked, "Gimme Gimme" from Thoroughly Modern Millie, "Another National Anthem" from Assassins, "The American Dream" from Miss Saigon, "Goodbye" from Catch Me If You Can, "Revolting Children" from Matilda The Musical, "I'm Here" from The Color Purple, and "Always Starting Over" from If/Then.

References 

Theatre